Demokraatti is a Finnish language magazine and Social Democratic Party organ published 23 times a year in Helsinki, Finland.

History and profile
Demokraatti was established in 1895. Its name in the beginning was Työmies (The Workman). The paper is headquartered in Helsinki and is the organ of the Social Democratic Party.

In late 1997 another social democratic paper, Turun Päivälehti, merged with Demokraatti.

The circulation of Demokraatti was 11,243 copies in 2014.

References

External links

1895 establishments in Finland
Daily newspapers published in Finland
Finnish-language newspapers
Newspapers published in Helsinki
Publications established in 1895